Rich, Young and Pretty is a 1951 musical film produced by Joe Pasternak for Metro-Goldwyn-Mayer and directed by Norman Taurog. Written by Dorothy Cooper and adapted as a screenplay by Cooper and Sidney Sheldon, it stars Jane Powell, Danielle Darrieux, Wendell Corey, and Fernando Lamas, features The Four Freshmen, and introduces Vic Damone. This was Darrieux's first Hollywood film since The Rage of Paris (1938).

Plot
Elizabeth (Jane Powell) accompanies her wealthy Texan rancher father (Wendell Corey) on a visit to Paris, where her mother (Danielle Darrieux) lives. In Paris, she meets Andre (Vic Damone), an eager young Frenchman. The father tries to keep her from marrying the Frenchman and avoid the mistake he made when he married her mother.

Cast

 Jane Powell as Elizabeth Rogers
 Danielle Darrieux as Marie Devarone
 Wendell Corey as Jim Stauton Rogers
 Vic Damone as  Andre Milan
 Fernando Lamas as Paul Sarnac
 Marcel Dalio as Claude Duval
 Una Merkel as Glynnie
 Richard Anderson as Bob Lennart
 Jean Murat as Henri Milan
 Hans Conreid as Maître d'Hotel
 Four Freshmen Quartet as Four Musicians

Songs
MGM promotion for the film emphasized the film's "songs rather than its patter"; Sammy Cahn wrote the lyrics and Nicholas Brodszky the music for several songs, including
 "Wonder Why" (which was nominated for an Academy Award for Best Original Song)

Other original songs by Cahn and Brodszky include
 "We Never Talk Much (We Just Sit Around)",
 "How D'Ya Like Your Eggs in the Morning?" and
 "I Can See You", both of which received radio airplay; "I Can See You" was also a jukebox favorite.

The film also features a "studied going over" of songs such as
 "Deep in the Heart of Texas" (written by June Hershey and Don Swander),
 "There's Danger in Your Eyes, Cherie" (written by Jack Maskill, Harry Richman, Pete Wendling) and
 "Old Piano Roll Blues" (written by Cy Coben).

Reception

Box office
According to MGM records, the film made $1,935,000 in the US and Canada and $1,064,000 elsewhere, making a profit of $54,000.

Critical reception
Time said the film was "aglow with Technicolor and plush sets" and said it treated a "light cinemusical subject with the butterscotch-caramel sentimentality of the bobby-soxers it is designed to please"; the film "tackles its situations without verve or humor, and handles its lightweight problems as ponderously as if they had been propounded by Ibsen in one of his gloomier moods."  Bosley Crowther of The New York Times called it "pretty as a picture postcard and just about as exciting."

References

External links

 
 
 
 

1951 films
1952 films
1952 musical comedy films
1952 romantic comedy films
American musical comedy films
American romantic comedy films
American romantic musical films
Films directed by Norman Taurog
Films set in Paris
Metro-Goldwyn-Mayer films
Films produced by Joe Pasternak
1951 comedy films
1950s English-language films
1950s American films